Peter Pearson (born December 17, 1995) is a Professional football player who currently plays as a midfielder. Born in the United States, he plays for the Saint Lucia national team.

Club career
Pearson signed his first professional contract in January 2019 with USL League One side South Georgia Tormenta FC. His only appearance with the team came in the First Round of the 2019 U.S. Open Cup, where Tormenta lost 1-0 to Greenville Triumph SC.

In January 2020, Pearson joined Oakland Roots SC of the National Independent Soccer Association.

Pearson signed with USL League One side North Carolina FC on February 17, 2021.

On January 28, 2022, Pearson signed with Greenville Triumph along with Jimmy Filerman. Following the 2022 season, his contract option was declined by Greenville.

International career
Born in the United States, Pearson is of Saint Lucian descent. He was called up to the Saint Lucia national team for a set of friendlies in May 2022, making his debut in a 3–2 loss to Guyana.

Career statistics

Club

Notes

References

External links
 
 Peter Pearson at the University of Virginia
 Peter Pearson at the Virginia Commonwealth University

1995 births
Living people
Sportspeople from Virginia Beach, Virginia
Soccer players from Virginia Beach
Saint Lucian footballers
Saint Lucia international footballers
American soccer players
American people of Saint Lucian descent
Association football midfielders
USL League Two players
National Independent Soccer Association players
VCU Rams men's soccer players
Virginia Cavaliers men's soccer players
Tormenta FC players
Des Moines Menace players
Oakland Roots SC players
North Carolina FC players
Fresno Fuego players
Chattanooga FC players
Greenville Triumph SC players